Neopontonides beaufortensis is a crustacean species in the family Palaemonidae first described by Lancelot Alexander Borradaile in 1920.

References 

Palaemonoidea
Crustaceans